Mark Swift and Damian Shannon are American screenwriters and film producers. They are known for their collaborative script-writing projects, in particular Freddy vs. Jason and later the 2009 reboot Friday the 13th.

Early life and education
Shannon attended Bishop McNamara High School and New York University.  He then enrolled at the University of Southern California, where he met fellow student and later writing partner Mark Swift.  Swift went on to graduate from Johns Hopkins University in Baltimore; he also attended the Benjamin School.

Career
Swift and Shannon wrote an adaptation of the comic book Danger Girl for New Line Cinema in 2000.  They were two of four writers on the 2004 animated film Shark Tale.

Swift and Shannon  wrote a script for the film Friday the 13th, which was released in 2009.  They also wrote a script for a sequel before that project was canceled. They had previously written the script for the 2003 film Freddy vs. Jason, after several previously written scripts had been rejected by the producers at New Line Cinema.

In 2011, Swift and Shannon were executive producers of the film Seconds Apart. In 2012 they wrote and directed a horror film for Disruption Entertainment.

They wrote the script for Baywatch (2017), an adaptation of the TV series.

In 2014, Swift and Shannon worked on an original horror project for New Line Cinema, and  co-produced O'Lucky Day, a comedy for Paramount Pictures starring Peter Dinklage.  In 2015, the pair worked together on a script for a live-action Aladdin prequel titled Genies.

Some of their unreleased projects include Vikings for Disney, an adaptation of the Image comic Hawaiian Dick, Inland Saints for Paramount, and an adaptation of Howard Chaykin’s graphic novel Power & Glory.

Filmography

References

External links
 

Year of birth missing (living people)
Living people
American film producers
American male writers
American male screenwriters
American screenwriters
Screenwriting duos